is the second studio album from Bright under the Rhythm Zone record label of the Avex Group, released on 24 February 2010. The album came in three versions: a CD+DVD version, a CD only version, and a CD only version with different cover art (only available to the Kinki region of Japan). With the first press of the CD+DVD and CD only versions came a poster. The album sold 4,437 copies in its first week, peaking at #38 on the Oricon charts.

Football Hour's Nozomu Iwao starred in the album's commercial advertisement.

Track listing
Theme of Bright ～Real～
I Like That
キライ…でも好き ～アイシテル～
Shining Butterfly
Kotoba ni Dekinakute
Warm It Up (Interlude)
Dance With Us
I Know
Secret
Feelin' You
Promise You
美女と野獣 (bonus track)

DVD track list
Kotoba ni Dekinakute(MV)
Shining Butterfly (MV)
Feelin' You (MV)
キライ…でも好き ～アイシテル～(MV)
Document Video (August 2009)

Charts

External links
 Bright's official site

References

Bright (Japanese band) albums
2010 albums
Avex Group albums